Miljan Pavković (born April 20, 1981) is a Serbian professional basketball coach and former player who is the head coach for Šenčur of the Slovenian League and the ABA League 2.

Professional career
Pavković started his professional career with Zdravlje in 1998. He spent six seasons in Leskovac, before transferring to NIS Vojvodina in 2004. Pavković left Novi Sad in 2005, signing for Budućnost Podgorica. After two seasons in Montenegro, he signed for Hemofarm in 2007, spending the next four years in Vršac. In the 2011–12 season, Pavković played with Radnički Kragujevac. In June 2012, Pavković moved abroad, signing with ČEZ Nymburk in the Czech Republic. In July 2013, Pavković signed with KK Igokea. On November 29, 2013, he signed with Steaua București. In September 2014, he signed with Rabotnički.

Coaching career
After retirement as a player with Šenčur in 2019, Pavković joined their coaching staff as an assistant coach. On 21 July 2021, Šenčur hired Pavković as their new head coach. On 24 June 2022, he signed a one-year contract extension with Šenčur.

References

External links
 Miljan Pavković at aba-liga.com
 Miljan Pavković at euroleague.net
 Miljan Pavković at eurobasket.com
 Miljan Pavković at fiba.com

1981 births
Living people
ABA League players
Basketball Nymburk players
KK Budućnost players
KK Igokea players
KK Hemofarm players
KK Radnički Kragujevac (2009–2014) players
KK Vojvodina Srbijagas players
KK Zdravlje players
People from Zaječar
Point guards
Serbian expatriate basketball people in Armenia
Serbian expatriate basketball people in Bosnia and Herzegovina
Serbian expatriate basketball people in Lithuania
Serbian expatriate basketball people in Montenegro
Serbian expatriate basketball people in the Czech Republic
Serbian expatriate basketball people in North Macedonia
Serbian expatriate basketball people in Romania
Serbian expatriate basketball people in Slovenia
Serbian men's basketball coaches
Serbian men's basketball players
BC Lietkabelis players